Karen Schimper (born 26 May 1967) is a former professional tennis player from South Africa.

Biography
Schimper, who comes from Bloemfontein, began competing on the professional tour in 1986, winning two ITF singles titles.

At the 1987 French Open she made it to the four round, competing as a qualifier. She had with wins over Maria Lindström, Lisa Bonder and Terry Phelps, before being eliminated by Gabriela Sabatini.

Her career best ranking of 75 in the world came in 1988.

ITF finals

Singles (2–3)

Doubles (0–2)

References

External links
 
 

1967 births
Living people
South African female tennis players
Sportspeople from Bloemfontein
White South African people